The Mutirikwe River (formerly Mtilikwe River) is a river in southeastern Zimbabwe. It is a tributary of the Runde River and its major tributaries include Pokoteke River.

The river is dammed at Lake Mutirikwe, which is recognised as an important wetland, and at Bangala Dam near Renco.

References

Rivers of Zimbabwe
Save River (Africa)